Sanchai Ratiwatana and  Sonchat Ratiwatana were the defending champions, but lost in the first round to Julien Benneteau and Nicolas Mahut.

Lukáš Dlouhý and Leander Paes won in the final 6–4, 7–6(7–4), against Scott Lipsky and David Martin.

Seeds

Draw

Draw

External links
 Draw

Doubles